The Heart-dhāraṇī of Avalokiteśvara-ekadaśamukha Sūtra (Chinese: 佛說十一面觀世音神咒經; Japanese: 十一面神呪心經 Jūichimen-jinshushin-gyō) is a Buddhist text first translated from Sanskrit into Chinese on the 28th day of the third lunar month of 656 CE, by Xuanzang.  The title in Tibetan language is Spyan-ras-gzigs-dbang-phyug-shal bcu-gcig-pa, while the Sanskrit title recovered from the Tibetan translation is Avalokiteśvara ikadaśamukha dhāraṇī.  Alternatively, the sutra's title has been translated as the Eleven-Faced Avalokitesvara Heart Dharani Sutra by Professor Ryuichi Abe.

There are several versions, which are often confused with each other. It is generally believed that this dhāraṇī has no direct relationship with the Great Compassion Mantra in Mahayana Buddhism. However, it is often falsely named as Tibetan Great Compassion Mantra (藏傳大悲咒) or The Great Compassion Mantra in Sanskrit (梵音大悲咒) in Chinese-speaking regions and in Vietnam, many people unduly conflating the two texts.

This sutra contents the dhāraṇī Heart-dhāraṇī of Avalokiteśvara-ekadaśamukha (Chinese:聖十一面觀自在菩薩根本咒). In the text, the Buddha introduces and talks about the benefits and the incredible power of this dhāraṇī.

There is a sung version of the dhāraṇī  which is very popular among Buddhists in Southeast Asia  being performed by famous religious or lay artists.

Several  versions 
We can refer to at least three sources to study this sutra, whose respective versions do not coincide exactly. The scholar Nalinaksha Dutt wrote in his book Gilgit manuscripts (1939): 

It should be kept in mind that until the discovery of the Gilgit manuscripts in 1931, the Ekadaśamukha-sūtra was known only from the Chinese and Tibetan versions, which in turn were retranslated into Sanskrit.  This means that the original language text could only be studied from 1931. Unfortunately, the manuscripts found dating from the 5th or 6th century are deteriorated or incomplete, and it is often difficult to reconstruct the exact text.

Hence the differences mentioned (at best), or (at worst), the near impossibility of reconstructing the text in its entirety. The Indian scholar Nalinaksha Dutt carried out, between 1939 and 1943, a considerable work of reconstitution of the Sanskrit manuscripts, without however translating them into English.

The Heart-dhāraṇī of Avalokiteśvara-ekadaśamukha Sūtra 

The text introduces the heart dharani of the Bodhisattva, Avalokitesvara, as the following lines, translated by Prof. Abe indicate:

Later, the Bodhisattva states:

The sutra is used in various Buddhist ceremonies, including the famous Shuni-e ceremony at Tōdai-ji Temple in Nara, Japan.  There is no full English translation.

Heart-dhāraṇī of Avalokiteśvara-ekadaśamukha 
The Heart-dhāraṇī of Avalokiteśvara-ekadaśamukha (Chinese:聖十一面觀自在菩薩根本咒/十一面觀音心咒) is the dhāraṇī introduced in Heart-dhāraṇī of Avalokiteśvara-ekadaśamukha Sūtra. Below is the romanized Sanskrit from  indian monk Amoghavajra (around 750 AD) version, Taishō T20n1069_001:

Ekadaśamukha-sūtra 
A third version must also be mentioned here. It differs slightly from that of Amoghavajra's  quoted above. Here is the romanised version in Sanskrit IAST. 

In fact, the Devanagari text is identical to that of Dutt , completed by the IAST transcription :

Relationship  to the Great Compassion Mantra     
It is generally believed that this dhāraṇī has no direct relationship with the Great Compassion Mantra , or Nīlakantha dhāranī  in Mahayana Buddhism. However, it is often falsely named as Tibetan Great Compassion Mantra (藏傳大悲咒) or The Great Compassion Mantra in Sanskrit (梵音大悲咒).  

In Chinese-speaking countries and in Vietnam,  the  Eleven-Faced Avalokiteśvara Heart dhāraṇī Sutra is as popular as the Nīlakaṇṭha Dhāraṇī, so much so that they are often confused with each other.  The confusion probably arises from the fact that the two dhāraṇī, though distinct, are also referred to by the same alternative title: Great Compassion Mantra. Their respective texts are very different, having only their reference to Avalokitesvara in common.

Some people believe that the dhāraṇī is told by the Eleven-Faced  Avalokitesvara, an esoteric bodhisattva in Tibetan Buddhism, and that it is the equivalent Tibetan version of The Great Compassion Mantra in Mahayana Buddhism. This is why it is often being referred to as Tibetan Great Compassion Mantra, while the sung text currently discussed is in Sanskrit.  However, this opinion is not accepted by most Mahayana Buddhists.

The title Eleven-Faced Avalokitesvara Heart Dharani Sutra is due to the Japanese historian Ryuichi Abe. The dhāraṇī  is also known with the title Tibetan Great Compassion Mantra (藏傳大悲咒), which suggests a Tibetan.

In Buddhist music

About the text  
The sung version presents several variants between the three known versions in Sanskrit, in Chinese and Tibetan, as already mentioned (see section "Several versions").

The text of the sung version of the dhāraṇī  (only in Sanskrit) appears in N. Dutt's Gilgit Manuscripts, volume I p. 148 of the digitized version accessible via archive.org , the Chinese is that of Amoghavajra  already mentioned, and the Tibetan is by an unidentified translator.   
The lyrics of this sung version are always interpreted in Sanskrit, regardless of the countries and interpreters.

One Song  Two titles  
There are several musical scores, whose tempo  varies (slow or fast) depending on the performers. The chanting of this dhāraṇī is one of the most popular and famous piece of Buddhist music  in Chinese-speaking countries and in Vietnam. Its popularity is probably due to the fact that it sung by famous Asian performers among Buddhists, such as the Nepalese-Tibetan  bhikkhunī  Ani Chöying Drölma, or  the Malaysian-Chinese  singer Imee Ooi.

However, many recordings of this chant is falsely named Tibetan Great Compassion Mantra (藏傳大悲咒) or The Great Compassion Mantra in Sanskrit (梵音大悲咒) by Chinese-language publishing brands.

Following the development of the internet in recent decades, the number of online postings by religious organisations is constantly increasing. Tens of thousands of sites offer the same interpretation, sometimes choreographed, some of which have several million views.

The fact that a dharani including in its title: Avalokiteśvara with eleven faces  is the subject of a real craze to the point of being assimilated to the "Nīlakaṇṭha" can easily be understood. Indeed, the scholar Lokesh Chandra  wrote:

English translation 
Here is the English translation of the most popular sung  text  in Chinese speaking countries and in Vietnam ,  realized from the romanized Sanskrit  (or   IAST)  Amogavajra's  version.  The numbers in brackets have been added, as the sentences (or verses)  in the original are not numbered: 
  
Namo Ratna Trayāya  (Homage to the Triple Gem)
 Namaḥ Ārya Jñāna Sāgara (Homage to the ocean of noble wisdom)  
 Vairocana   (The  Luminous One or The Illuminator) 
 Vyūha Rājāya  (To the King of the Manifestations.) 
 Tathāgatāya  (To the Tathāgata)  
 Arhate  (To the Arhat) 
 Samyaksam Buddhāya  (To the perfectly awakened one) 
 Namo Sarwa Tathātebhyaḥ (Homage to all Tathāgatas) 
 Arahatabhyah (To the Arhats)  
 Samyaksam Buddhebhyaḥ  (To the fully and perfectly awakened ones )  
 Namo Arya Avalokiteśvarāya  (Homage to Noble Avalokiteśvara ) 
 Bodhisattvāya (To the Bodhisattva) 
 Mahasattvāya  (To the Great)  
 Mahakarunikāya  (To the Greatly Compassionate one) 
 Tadyathā. Ōṃ  (Thus. Om)   
 Dhara Dhara,  Dhiri Dhiri, Dhuru Dhuru (Sustain us , Sustain us, Sustain us )     
 Iṭṭe vitte  ( May we have the strength  )  
 Cale Cale (or Itte cale) ( To move forward, to move forward ) 
 Pracale Pracale ( To move forward further, to move further along the path )  
 Kusumē, Kusumavare ( Where to pick the fruits .) 
 Ili Milli  Citi jvalam Apanāye. Svāhā.  (Who bring the blazing understanding. Hail!).

Ani Chöying Drölma is a Nepalese-Tibetan Buddhist bhikkhunī. In concert and recordings, she performs the sung version of the Eleven-Faced Avalokiteśvara Heart dhāraṇī Sutra, in Sanskrit, but entitled Namo Ratna Great Compassion Mantra.

Imee Ooi is a Malaysian-Chinese singer, who has recorded  the Eleven-Faced Avalokiteśvara Heart dhāraṇī Sutra  in Sanskrit, but entitled  Arya Ekadasa-Mukha Dharani which she also performs in concert.

Notes

References

Works cited 
.
 . .

. .

External links
 Chinese version of sutra translated by Xuanzang in  the Taisho Tripitaka (T20.1071). .

Buddhist texts
Avalokiteśvara
Buddhist mantras